Parathyroid hormone/parathyroid hormone-related peptide receptor, also known as parathyroid hormone 1 receptor (PTH1R), is a protein that in humans is encoded by the PTH1R gene. PTH1R functions as a receptor for parathyroid hormone (PTH) and for parathyroid hormone-related protein (PTHrP), also called parathyroid hormone-like hormone (PTHLH).

Function 
This "classical" PTH receptor is expressed in high levels in bone and kidney and regulates calcium ion homeostasis through activation of adenylate cyclase and phospholipase C. In bone, it is expressed on the surface of osteoblasts. When the receptor is activated through PTH binding, osteoblasts express RANKL (Receptor Activator of Nuclear Factor kB Ligand), which binds to RANK (Receptor Activator of Nuclear Factor kB) on osteoclasts. This turns on osteoclasts to ultimately increase the resorption rate.

Mechanism
It is a member of the secretin family of G protein-coupled receptors. The activity of this receptor is mediated by Gs G proteins, which activate adenylyl cyclase. Besides this, they also activate the phosphatidylinositol-calcium second messenger system.

Pathology
Defects in this receptor are known to be the cause of Jansen's metaphyseal chondrodysplasia (JMC) and chondrodysplasia Blomstrand type (BOCD) as well as enchondromatosis and primary failure of tooth eruption.

Interactions 

Parathyroid hormone 1 receptor has been shown to interact with Sodium-hydrogen exchange regulatory cofactor 2 and Sodium-hydrogen antiporter 3 regulator 1.

Model organisms 

Model organisms have been used in the study of PTH1R function. A conditional knockout mouse line called Pth1rtm1a(EUCOMM)Hmgu was generated at the Wellcome Trust Sanger Institute. Male and female animals underwent a standardized phenotypic screen to determine the effects of deletion. Additional screens performed:  - In-depth immunological phenotyping

See also 
 Parathyroid hormone receptor

References

Further reading

External links 
 
 

G protein-coupled receptors